The Glyndŵr Award (Welsh: Gwobr Glyndŵr) is made for an outstanding contribution to the arts in Wales. It is given by the Machynlleth Tabernacle Trust to pre-eminent figures in music, art and literature in rotation. The award takes its name after Owain Glyndŵr, crowned Prince of Wales at Machynlleth in 1404.

The award consists of a large medal in silver, bearing a stylised design of Cardigan Bay and the Dyfi river, with the location of Machynlleth marked by an inlaid bead of pure unmixed 18ct Welsh gold from the Gwynfynydd gold mine, near Ganllwyd, Dolgellau.  The bilingual Glyndŵr medal was designed in 1995 by designer and goldsmith Kelvin Jenkins, whose studio is in Machynlleth, and has been handmade by him for presentation to every winner since then.

Recipients

The composer Ian Parrott (1994)
The painter Sir Kyffin Williams (1995)
The writer Jan Morris (1996)
The composer Alun Hoddinott (1997)
The painter Iwan Bala (1998)
The poet Gillian Clarke (1999)
The harpist Robin Huw Bowen (2000)
The sculptor John Meirion Morris (2001)
The poet Gerallt Lloyd Owen (2002)
The harpist Elinor Bennett (2003)
The painter Peter Prendergast (2004)
The historian Dr John Davies (2005)
The composer Rhian Samuel (2006)
The painter Shani Rhys James (2007)
The poet bard Tudur Dylan Jones (2008)
The pianist Llŷr Williams (2009)
The sculptor David Nash RA (2010)
The writer Mererid Hopwood (2011)
The conductor and musicologist David Russell Hulme (2012)
The painter David Tress (2013)
The writer Angharad Price (2014)
The conductor and pianist Eirian Owen  (2015)
The writer Dylan Iorwerth  (2017)
The composer Sir Karl Jenkins (2018)

See also

 List of European art awards

References

External links
 The Machynlleth Festival 
 Kelvin Jenkins Jewellery Glyndŵr Award
 University of Aberystwyth
 Connaught Brown; Rhys James biography

Welsh music awards
British art awards
Welsh literary awards
Awards established in 1994
1994 establishments in Wales
Cultural depictions of Owain Glyndŵr